Quow is a surname. Notable people with the surname include:

 Elliott Quow (born 1962), American athlete
 Renny Quow (born 1987), Trinidadian athlete
 Trevor Quow (born 1960), English footballer